Secretos de Familia (Family Secrets) is a Mexican telenovela, remake of Brothers & Sisters by Azteca in 2013. In January 2013, confirmed cast included Sergio Basañez and Anette Michel as the protagonists. From May 13 to October 4, 2013, Azteca 13 aired Secretos de Familia, replacing La Otra Cara del Alma.

Plot summary 
Nora Ventura (Ofelia Medina), matriarch of the Ventura family, awaits the return of her daughter, Cecilia (Anette Michel), who went to Monterrey for two years. But Cecilia returns home with a broken heart, because her boyfriend, Juan Pablo (Juan Pablo Medina), has been unfaithful to him; However, he decides to keep it a secret.

When Cecilia arrives at her house, she is received by all with great joy, but it soon becomes apparent that Eduardo (Jesús Vargas), Cecilia's father and Nora's husband, is cold with his wife; This is because he has been unfaithful for years. On the other hand, Sandra (Fran Meric), Daniel (Alberto Casanova) and Andrés (Luis Ernesto Franco), Cecilia's brothers, begin to suspect that their uncle Raul is making embezzlements.

Later, Cecilia meets in a park a young man named Maximiliano Miranda (Sergio Basañez), whom he falls in love with, and with whom he also coincides in his work. However, the joy and harmony of the Ventura will be truncated with the sudden death of Eduardo in a family reunion.

From that moment, the four brothers will be immersed in situations and circumstances that they had not imagined, because now they will have to work together to save the company, stay united and support Nora (Ofelia Medina), who will have to endure the presence of The lover of her late husband.

Cast

Main 
 Sergio Basañez as Maximiliano Miranda
 Anette Michel as Cecilia Ventura
 Patricia Bernal as Karina Álvarez
 Alberto Casanova as Daniel Ventura
 Héctor Arredondo as Leonardo Ventura
 Fran Meric as Sandra Ventura
 Luis Ernesto Franco as Andrés Ventura
 Luis Miguel Lombana as Raúl
 Bárbara de Regil as Sofía Ventura Álvarez
 Ángela Fuste as Patricia Mendoza de Miranda
 Martín Altomaro as Roberto
 Francisco Angelini as Tomás
 Nubia Martí as Evangelina Mendoza
 Ariana Ron Pedrique as Mónica
 Concepción Márquez as Nieves
 Jesús Vargas as Eduardo Ventura
 Hugo Stiglitz as Eduardo Ventura
 Gala Montes as Julieta Miranda
 Ivana María as María Ventura
 Marlon Bidart as Luis Ventura
 Adrián Herrera as Santiago Miranda
 Ofelia Medina as Nora Ventura

Recurring 
 Fernando Becerril as Rogelio
 Héctor Bonilla as Manuel
 Ariel López Padilla as Vicente Quiroz
 Juan Pablo Medina as Juan Pablo
 Guillermo Quintanilla as David
 Gloria Stalina as Marisol

References

External links 
 

Mexican telenovelas
2013 Mexican television series debuts
2013 telenovelas
TV Azteca telenovelas
Spanish-language telenovelas
2013 Mexican television series endings
Mexican television series based on American television series